Hotel Berlin is a historic 4-star hotel in Berlin, Germany, located in the Berlin district of Tiergarten (district center) at Lützowplatz. It is one of the largest hotels in Germany with 701 rooms.

External links
Official site

Hotels in Berlin
Hotel buildings completed in 1958
Hotels established in 1958
1958 establishments in Germany